A Turkophile or Turcophile, is a person who has a strong positive predisposition or sympathy toward the government, culture, history, or people of Turkey. This could include Turkey itself and its history, the Turkish language, Turkish cuisine, and literature, or in the broader sense, the Turkic peoples in general. The opposite of a Turkophile is a Turkophobe  is a person who shows hostility, intolerance, or racism against Turkish or Turkic people, Turkish culture and Turkic countries.

Notable Turkophiles 

 Jean-Étienne Liotard, Swiss painter, art connoisseur and dealer
 David Urquhart, Scottish diplomat, writer and politician
 Ármin Vámbéry,  Hungarian Turkologist and traveller
 Ernst Jaeckh, German author
 Pierre Loti, French naval officer and novelist
 Juanito, French singer
 Lev Gumilyov, Soviet historian, ethnologist and anthropologist
 Li Chengqian, Tang dynasty crown prince

See also 
 Anti-Turkish sentiment
 Turanism
 Turquerie

References

External links
 

Admiration of foreign cultures
Turkish culture
Turkish nationalism